Gonin is a Japanese word meaning "five people".  It may also refer to:

 Gonin, 1995 film directed by Takashi Ishii
 Gonin (surname), list of people with the surname
Gonin Saga, 2015 Japanese drama film
Gonin Gumi, groups of five households during the Tokugawa period of Japanese history
Aurora Gonin Musume, short-lived Japanese J-Pop group
Gonin Medal, international award in ophthalmology

See also
Goninan